Blaze o' Glory is a 1929 American musical war film directed by George Crone and Renaud Hoffman. It stars Eddie Dowling and Betty Compson.

The soundtrack survives.

Plot 
At the stand of his murder trial, defendant Eddie Williams recounts his experiences. In 1917, he had a successful Broadway stage career and marriage to Helen Williams. However, with the American entry into World War I he was sent to the Western Front and debilitated by poison gas when saving an Imperial German Army soldier. After returning home Eddie becomes unemployed, while to his chagrin Helen is able to hold a job. After finding Helen in an affair with her employer Carl Hummel, he shoots Hummel in a fit of rage. The District Attorney reveals that Helen only entered the relationship to gain the job to support Eddie, and they reconcile. Although Eddie confessed to the murder, the jury acquits him.

Cast
Eddie Dowling as Eddie Williams
Betty Compson as Helen Williams
Frankie Darro as Jean Williams
Henry B. Walthall as Burke
William B. Davidson as District Attorney (credited as William Davidson)
Ferdinand Schumann-Heink as Carl Hummel
Eddie Conrad as Abie
Frank Sabini as Tony
Broderick O'Farrell

References

External links

1929 films
1929 musical films
American musical films
American black-and-white films
Films directed by Renaud Hoffman
American World War I films
Western Front (World War I) films
Films about chemical war and weapons
Courtroom films
1920s American films
1920s English-language films